Timon Rüegg (born 24 January 1996) is a Swiss road and cyclo-cross cyclist, who currently rides for UCI Cyclo-cross Pro Team Cross Team Legendre.

Major results

Cyclo-cross

2012–2013
 2nd National Junior Championships
2013–2014
 2nd National Junior Championships
2014–2015
 3rd National Under-23 Championships
2015–2016
 1st  National Under-23 Championships
2016–2017
 2nd National Under-23 Championships
2017–2018
 1st  National Under-23 Championships
2018–2019
 1st  National Championships
2019–2020
 1st Madiswil
 2nd National Championships
 3rd Steinmaur
2020–2021
 2nd Overall EKZ CrossTour
2nd Hittnau
 3rd National Championships
2021–2022
 Stockholm Weekend
1st Täby Park
1st Stockholm
 1st Meilen
 2nd Overall Coupe de France
1st Bagnoles-de-l'Orne Day 1
2nd Troyes
2nd Quelneuc
2nd Bagnoles de l'Orne Day 2
 2nd Illnau
 3rd National Championships
 3rd Lützelbach
2022–2023
 2nd Fayetteville
 3rd Mettmenstetten

Road
2020
 7th Overall Tour Bitwa Warszawska 1920

References

External links

1996 births
Living people
Swiss male cyclists
Cyclists from Zürich
Cyclo-cross cyclists